The Spain national under-20 rugby union team is the junior national rugby union team from Spain. The team competed at the  World Rugby Under 20 Trophy.

Spain qualified for the 2016 Under 20 Trophy after defeating  24-3 in the European Under-19 Rugby Union Championship 2015.

Overall 
Summary for all under 20 matches at the  World Rugby Under 20 Trophy:

Current squad
Squad to 2016 World Rugby Under 20 Trophy:

U
European national under-20 rugby union teams